The 2 Division, Nigerian Army is a division, active since the Nigerian Civil War. Its headquarters are now at Ibadan in the South-West. The current and 43rd General Officer Commanding is Major General Muhammed Takuti Usman.

Operations 
The division is "charged with the responsibility of securing its Area of Responsibility (AOR) covering the South Western flank of Nigeria and also ensuring that the borders located in its AOR are secured. The division is a mechanized infantry (sic: formation) with affiliated combat support and combat service support units."

At the start of the Nigerian Civil War, the 2 Division was responsible for the beating back of the Biafran Army to the River Niger.

In 2018, the annual 2 Division Army Inter Brigade Warrant Officers and Senior Non-Commissioned Officers Competition was announced to be held from August 13–17.

Structure 
The division previously included:

 2 Division Garrison (Ibadan)
 4 Brigade (Benin City)
 19 Battalion (Okitipupa)
 22 Brigade (Ilorin)
 32 Artillery Brigade (Abeokuta)
 42 Brigade (Akure)
 42 Engineer Brigade (Ibadan)
 52 Signal Brigade (Ibadan)
 195 Battalion (Agenebode)

Commanders 

 Major General Murtala Muhammed (circa 1967-June 1968)

 Major General Aminu Chinade (12 August 2022-31 January 2023)
 Major General Muhammed Takuti Usman (since 31 January 2023)

References

Military units and formations of Nigeria